Merrahøi is a mountain on the border of Skjåk Municipality and Lom Municipality in Innlandet county, Norway (just east of the border with Luster Municipality in Vestland county). The mountain is surrounded by several other notable mountains including Vetledalsnosi to the west, Holåtindan to the northwest, Vesldalstinden to the north, and Svartdalshøi, Steindalshøi, and Hestbrepiggene to the northeast.

See also
List of mountains of Norway

References

Lom, Norway
Skjåk
Mountains of Innlandet